Senior lieutenant colonel (SLTC) is a rank in the Singapore Armed Forces, ranking just above lieutenant colonel and below colonel. The senior lieutenant colonel rank designates those who have been tapped for higher appointments in the army, navy and air force. The insignia for the rank of SLTC consists of two Singapore state crests and a pair of laurels.

See also
 Singapore Armed Forces ranks

References

Military ranks of Singapore